"Last Request" is the debut single by Scottish singer-songwriter Paolo Nutini, from his 2006 debut album, These Streets. The song was released on 3 July 2006, and peaked at number five on the UK Singles Chart and number 15 on the Italian Singles Chart. The song's lyrics describe a person who knows his relationship is over, but he wants to have one last time with his partner.

Music video
The video features Paolo Nutini along with other masked men robbing a jewellery shop before the police arrive and shoot Nutini who appears to die at the end of the video.

Track listings

UK CD1
 "Last Request"
 "Last Request" (live version)
 "Last Request" (video)
 "Last Request" (making of)

UK CD2 and European CD single
 "Last Request"
 "No No No"

UK 7-inch single
A. "Last Request"
B. "Sugar Man"

Australian CD single
 "Last Request"
 "No, No, No"
 "Sugar Man"

Personnel
Personnel are taken from the These Streets album booklet.

 Paolo Nutini – writing, vocals
 Jim Duguid – writing
 Matty Benbrook – writing, strings, additional programming, string production
 Donny Little – backing vocals, guitar, acoustic guitar
 Ken Nelson – guitar, production
 Eddie Harrison – guitar
 Mike Hunter – bass
 Jim Duguid – keyboards, drums, percussion
 Tom Elmhirst – mixing
 Mark Phythian – engineering
 Darren Simpson – assistant engineering
 Richard Wilkinson – additional engineering

Charts

Weekly charts

Year-end charts

Certifications

Release history

Cover versions
In 2017, the song was covered by British singer Amber Leigh Irish for use in a TV advertising campaign for the British bed retailer and manufacturer Dreams. The recording was subsequently released as a charity single, with all proceeds going to The Fostering Network.

References

2006 songs
2006 debut singles
Atlantic Records singles
Number-one singles in Scotland
Paolo Nutini songs
Songs written by Jim Duguid
Songs written by Paolo Nutini